"Trading Places" is a song ·by American recording artist Usher. Released on October 17, 2008 as the fifth and final single from his fifth studio album Here I Stand, Usher wrote the song with The-Dream and Carlos "Los Da Mystro" McKinney. Produced by McKinney, it is a slow-tempo R&B ballad with hip hop influences, and focuses on an idea of role reversal in a relationship.

The song appeared on the US Billboard Hot 100 and Hot R&B/Hip-Hop Songs, peaking at numbers forty-five and four, respectively. A music video was filmed for the song, which demonstrated intimate sexual scenes, and promoted Usher's lingerie line. Usher performed "Trading Places" on both his One Night Stand: Ladies Only Tour (2008) and OMG Tour (2010–11).

Background and composition
"Trading Places" was written by The-Dream, Carlos "Los Da Mystro" McKinney and Usher, and produced by McKinney, while Jaycen Joshua mixed the record. The song was recorded at Music Line Studio, Triangle Sound Studios and Chalice Recording Studios, and was released on October 17, 2008.

"Trading Places" is a slow-tempo R&B ballad, and contains influences of hip hop music. McKinney used the drums that appear in J. Holiday's "Bed"; "Trading Places" also uses guitar instrumentation.
The theme of the song surrounds role reversal in a relationship, predominantly in sexual situations, with its hook consisting of the lyrics, "I'm always on the top, tonight I'm on the bottom / 'cause we trading places". Usher described the song's idea as "wishful thinking for all men to have a woman who takes control and compliments us the way we compliment them", and Steve Jones of USA Today saw the song as a way for Usher to "satisfy his inner freak ... within the confines of marriage." Angela Barrett of Rap-Up noted "Trading Places" as a male version of "Cater 2 U" (2004) by Destiny's Child.  Is also sampled from You which appeared on Chris Brown’s 2007 album Exclusive.

Reception
Digital Spy's David Balls gave "Trading Places" three out of five stars, and wrote that the song's lyrics "may be verging on the sickly, but Usher just about gets away with it". Mark Edward Nero of About.com called it "all-around excellent: the vocals, production and (especially the) lyrics all excel". Andy Kellman from Allmusic said that the song was the best of "the small handful of brow-raising moments" on Here I Stand.
IGN's Chad Grischow criticized the song's production, calling it "a muddled mess".

Chart performance
"Trading Places" debuted on the United States Billboard Hot 100 at number one hundred on November 15, 2008. The next week it moved ten places to number ninety. The song peaked in its seventh charting week, when it reached number forty-five on the final chart of 2008. "Trading Places" fell off the Hot 100 after seventeen weeks.
The song was more successful on the Billboard Hot R&B/Hip-Hop Songs chart, where it entered at number ninety-six. On January 3, 2009, it climbed to its high position of number four, and slipped off the chart in April 2009 after thirty-three weeks.

Music video
The music video for "Trading Places" was shot on September 9, 2008 in Venice, Los Angeles, and was directed by Chris Robinson. Of the video's concept Usher said, "We wanted to do something ... very hot and very forward-thinking". The video also serves as his media to introduce his new line of lingerie, with his love interest in the video wearing some designs.

In the video Usher and his love interest simulate sexual intercourse, with the woman maintaining dominance, echoing the song's theme. Interspersed are scenes of him playing the song on a transparent piano, sitting in a chair singing and dancing against a brick backdrop. In some of the sex scenes the camera is rotated 180 degrees, so that an illusion is given from Usher being "on the top" to being "on the bottom".

Live performances
Usher performed "Trading Places" along with "Here I Stand" and "What's Your Name" at the warmup concert for the 2008 National Football League Kickoff game on September 4.
Usher sang the song on his 2008 One Night Stand: Ladies Only tour. He began the song seated at a grand piano, while a female backup dancer removed Usher's shirt and, while wearing the shirt herself, lay on top of the piano.

He also performed "Trading Places" on his international OMG Tour, which commenced in November 2010, and concluded in June 2011.  During the performance, he calls a female fan from the audience and sings to her as they dance seductively. This resulted in a mishap during a December 2010 performance at the Madison Square Garden when a fan tried to swing her foot over Usher but accidentally kicked him in the head. At the Glendale, Arizona show, he called American Idol season six winner Jordin Sparks onto the stage to perform the number with him. At one of the London dates, English singer Alesha Dixon accompanied him onstage for the performance.

Track listings

Digital EP
"Trading Places" – 4:29
"Trading Places" (FP Remix) – 3:51
"Trading Places" (Monk & Prof Remix) – 4:55

Spanish digital download
"Trading Places" – 4:28
"Trading Places" (music video) – 4:27

Personnel

The-Dream – writing
Kuk Harrell – vocal production, recording
Carlos "Los Da Mystro" McKinney – writing, production
Scott Naughton – recording

Jaycen Joshua – mixing
Dave Pensado – mixing
Usher – writing, vocals
Andrew Wuepper – assistant mixing

Source:

Charts

Weekly charts

Year-end charts

References

External links
 

2008 songs
Music videos directed by Chris Robinson (director)
Usher (musician) songs
Contemporary R&B ballads
Songs written by The-Dream
Songs written by Carlos McKinney
LaFace Records singles
2008 singles
Songs written by Usher (musician)
2000s ballads